Lars Bloch (6 August 1938 – 27 March 2022), was a Danish-Italian actor and producer, sometimes credited as Lars Block or Carlos Ewing.

Born in Hellerup, after military service in the Navy, Bloch moved to Italy and in the late 1950s embarked upon a prolific career as a character actor, specializing in villainous roles. In the 1980s, Bloch semi-retired from acting and instead became a DVD producer and distributor of Italian films, especially Spaghetti Westerns, in Japan.

Selected filmography

References

External links 
 

1938 births
2022 deaths
Danish male actors
Danish film producers
Danish emigrants to Italy
People from Gentofte Municipality